Chalk carving is the practice and shaping of chalk via carving . This article covers some methods, types of chalk, tools used and the benefits (and ramifications) of this material.

The benefits of this material are also its drawbacks. Its main benefit, its softness, makes it very easy to manipulate. This is also a serious disadvantage, however, as chalk structures tend to be very delicate. This material is also extremely brittle and dusty. However it is cheap, readily available, easy to work with the simplest of tools, and able to hold a reasonable amount of detail.

The main types of chalk, for the purposes of the carver, are processed and non-processed (natural). Processed chalk has several advantages over natural chalk; it is softer, more consistent and comes ready finished in neat cylinders of varying sizes. However, natural chalk is available in more interesting shapes, the size is not limited, and it holds detail better.

Tools for chalk carving are numerous. In fact any small file, stone carving equipment (no mallet is needed), and even needles can be used. Some of the best hand carving equipment are an etching needle, a selection of small files, and a miniature carving tool designed for soapstone.

The methods are very simple. Once the carver has a feel for the material, it is possible to construct fairly complex shapes, and make figurative work. It is possible to coat the chalk in button polish to produce a finish.

Chalk is considered by seasoned stone carvers as one of the most difficult of stones to shape, as the material may literally powder away in your hands, if you are not delicate with the handling. A chalk can also have many defects and voids in its structure, this makes chalk carving a very difficult and precise art.

In India Artist Ramita Bhaduri is the pioneer in Chalk Sculpture. For more than two decades she has used chalk to create a variety of forms and compositions.

Types of Chalk Carving 

There are two types of chalk carvings.

1. Single piece
A carved object or relief consisting of one piece of chalk.

2. Multi-piece
A carved object or relief using two or more individual pieces of chalk.

See also 

 Geoglyph
 Hill figure
 Stone carving

External links 
 Article with examples
 A collection of chalk carvings with a modern touch 
 A world of chalk carving

Carving